Sebec may refer to:

Places
 Sebec, Maine, USA; a town located in Piscataquis County
 Sebec River, a tributary of the Piscataquis River; located in Piscataquis County, Maine, USA
 Sebec Lake, the source of the Sebec River; located in Piscataquis County, Maine, USA
 Sebec-Piscataquis River Confluence Prehistoric Archeological District, Piscataquis County, Maine, USA
 Sebec (crater), on Mars

Transportation
 , a U.S. Navy ship name
 , a WWII-era USN fleet oiler
 , a U.S. Coast Guard ship name
 , a WWII-era USCG cutter

Other uses
 Sebec House, a residence at the University of Maine
 Saeki Electronics & Biological & Energy Corporation (SEBEC), a fictional company from (Persona 1) the 1996 videogame Revelations: Persona

See also

 
 
 Sayabec, Gaspesie, Quebec, Canada
 Sayabec station, train station
 Sebek crocodilians
 Sebecus (genus)
 Sebecidae (subfamilia)
 Sebecia (familia)
 Sebecosuchia (suprafamilia)
 Sebek (disambiguation)
 Zebec (disambiguation)